Forward Space is an album by American-born, British-based trumpeter Andre Canniere. It was released on Whirlwind Recordings on 23 January 2012.

Track list
 Crunch
 Forward Space
 Cure
 Marshlands Blackout
 September Piece
 Lost in Translation
 Spreading Hypocrisy
 Song for J

Credits
 Andre Canniere – trumpet (tracks 1–3 and 5–8), flugelhorn (track 4), melodica (track 3), Rhodes piano (track 8 only), guitar (track 8 only), cahon (track 8 only)
 Hannes Riepler – guitar
 George Fogel – piano, keyboards
 Ryan Trebilcock – double bass
 Jon Scott – drums (tracks 2, 6, 7)
 Chris Vatalaro – drums (tracks 1, 3, 4, 5)
 Recorded in London, 2011
 Mix & mastered by Tyler McDiarmid, NYC, October, 2011
 Produced by Andre Canniere
 Executive producer – Michael Janisch

References

2012 albums
Andre Canniere albums